Climatius (from  , 'gradation') is an extinct genus of spiny shark. Fossils have been found in both Europe and North America.

Climatius was an active swimmer, judging from its powerful caudal fin and abundant stabilizing fins, and probably preyed on other fish and crustaceans. Its lower jaw was lined with sharp teeth which were replaced when worn, but the upper jaw had no teeth. It had large eyes, suggesting that it hunted by sight.

There was one spine each on the paired pelvic and pectoral fins, and on the aingle anal and two dorsal fins, and a four pairs without fins on the fish's underside.

See also

List of acanthodians

References
 Parker, Steve. Dinosaurus: the complete guide to dinosaurs. Firefly Books Inc, 2003. Pg. 60

Acanthodii genera
Silurian acanthodians
Devonian acanthodians
Devonian fish of North America
Silurian fish of North America
Devonian fish of Europe
Silurian fish of Europe
Paleozoic life of Nova Scotia
Taxa named by Louis Agassiz